The 1967 Hong Kong Urban Council election was held on 7 June 1967 for the five of the ten elected seats of the Urban Council of Hong Kong. A record of 38.7 per cent turnout as 10,130 of the 26,202 eligible voters came out and cast their ballots, in the middle of the Leftists' disturbances.

Incumbent Dr. Raymond Harry Shoon Lee, also the Reform Club vice-chairman who had earlier announced his intention retired, left Hong Kong for permanent residence abroad and his vacancy was taken by Woo Po-shing, while prominent activist Elsie Elliott who left the Club earlier and ran as an independent received the highest votes. The other newcomer was independent Dr. Denny Huang who defeated incumbent Cheung Wing-in of the Hong Kong Civic Association.

Results

Citations

References
 Lau, Y.W. (2002). A history of the municipal councils of Hong Kong : 1883-1999 : from the Sanitary Board to the Urban Council and the Regional Council. Leisure and Cultural Service Dept. 
 Pepper, Suzanne (2008). Keeping Democracy at Bay:Hong Kong and the Challenge of Chinese Political Reform. Rowman & Littlefield.

Hong Kong
1967 in Hong Kong
Urban
June 1967 events in Asia
1967 elections in the British Empire